Flamingo is an album by flautist Herbie Mann on the Bethlehem label which was recorded in 1955. The album opens with Mann playing four flutes via the use of overdubbing.

Reception

Allmusic awarded the album 3 stars.

Track listing 
All compositions by Herbie Mann except where noted.
 "I've Told Ev'ry Little Star" (Jerome Kern, Oscar Hammerstein II) - 4:40
 "Love Is a Simple Thing" (Arthur Siegel, June Carroll) - 2:00
 "There's No You" (Hal Hopper, Tom Adair) - 4:12
 "Sorimaό" - 3:25
 "The Influential Mr. Cohn" - 2:33
 "A One Way Love" - 3:16
 "The Surrey with the Fringe on Top" (Richard Rodgers, Hammerstein) - 2:39
 "Flamingo" (Ted Grouya, Edmund Anderson) - 2:43
 "Little Orphan Annie" (Gus Kahn, Joe Sanders) - 3:28
 "Jasmin" (Quincy Jones) - 3:00
 "Beverly" - 2:04
 "Woodchuck" (Joe Puma) - 2:54

Personnel 
Herbie Mann - flute, tenor saxophone
Joe Puma - guitar
Charles Andrus - bass
Harold Granowsky - drums

References 

Herbie Mann albums
1955 albums
Bethlehem Records albums